Bernice A. Akamine (born December 1, 1949) is an American artist and Hawaiian rights activist. Her visual art has taken multiple forms, including glass and feathers, and she teaches traditional Hawaiian art techniques such as the creation of kapa cloth and natural dyeing using Hawaiian plants. Akamine is an advocate for Indigenous land rights, using her artwork to bring attention to the colonial invasion of Hawaii and its continued effects on the native Hawaiian population.

Early life and education

Bernice A. Akamine was born in Honolulu, Hawaii, on December 1, 1949. Her heritage is kānaka maoli (Native Hawaiian) and Japanese American. Akamine's grandmother was a kahuna lāʻau lapaʻau, a traditional Hawaiian healer, and her mother, Audrey Elliott, was a lauhala weaver. 

Akamine earned two degrees from the University of Hawaii at Manoa: a Bachelor of Fine Arts degree in glass in 1994 and a Master of Fine Arts degree in sculpture and glass in 1999. She studied multiple traditional Hawaiian art forms at the university, such as lei hulu (feather leis) and lauhala weaving. She has also completed graduate work at Central Washington University in natural resource management.

Artwork

Akamine's artwork focuses on environmental and cultural issues, especially the 1893 overthrow of the Hawaiian Kingdom and the ongoing Hawaiian sovereignty movement. She is a kumu (expert teacher) of the methods of creating and using waiho‘olu‘u (natural plant dyes). During a 2005 internship at the Amy B. H. Greenwell Ethnobotanical Garden, she documented the colors created with these dyes, pairing 20 samples of dye with plant photos.

Akamine creates kapa, cloth created by beating bark. She was featured in a 2015 documentary, Ka Hana Kapa, along with other kapa makers and has served as a consultant to the Smithsonian Institution, helping them identify the plants that made the kapa colors on items in their collections. She has also created contemporary baskets inspired by traditional symbols of Hawaiian nobility, using the feathers of small birds. Akamine says her art "is meant to make a statement and preserve cultural knowledge."

Selected projects
 Kalo (2015): large-scale traveling installation featuring 87 individual kalo plants made from pōhaku (stone) and newsprint
 Hinalua’iko’a (2017): suspended and freestanding beaded sculptures inspired by traditional Hawaiian fish traps, oceanic forms, and Kumulipo, the Hawaiian creation chant
 Papahanaumoku (2018): mixed media pieces of glass and used bullet casing created in response to the 2018 Hawaii false missile alert
 Ku‘u One Hānau (2019): five tents made with the Hawaiian flag drawing attention to homelessness within the kānaka maoli (Native Hawaiian) population

Awards and fellowships
 Pilchuck Partners Scholarship to Pilchuck Glass School, 1995
 Native Arts Research Fellowship, Smithsonian National Museum of the American Indian, 1999
 Community Scholar Award, Smithsonian National Museum of Natural History, 2012
 Native Hawaiian Artist Fellowship, Native Arts and Cultures Foundation, 2015

References

External links
 "HB19 Artist Bernice Akamine" 4-minute video of Akamine describing her large-scale exhibit "Kalo" exhibited during the 2019 Honolulu Biennial
 "How Kapa Is Made" 3-minute audio of Akamine discussing the origins of bark cloth

Living people
1949 births
People from Honolulu
University of Hawaiʻi at Mānoa alumni
Artists from Hawaii
21st-century American women artists
Native Hawaiian people
American people of Native Hawaiian descent
Native Hawaiian activists
American textile artists